Denis Kudla was the defending champion, but chose not to defend his title.

Lu Yen-hsun won the title after defeating Vincent Millot 7–6(7–4), 6–2 in the final.

Seeds

Draw

Finals

Top half

Bottom half

References
 Main Draw
 Qualifying Draw

Aegon Ilkley Trophy - Singles
2016 Men's Singles